is a series of role-playing video games developed by Sega. The first game, Shining in the Darkness, was a first-person dungeon crawler with randomly encountered, turn-based battles (comparable to Wizardry and Might and Magic). The next game released in the series was Shining Force, which was a turn-based strategy style tactical role-playing game with battle scenes acted out with sprites (comparable to Fire Emblem). Other directions include Shining Soul, a dungeon crawl action role-playing game with roguelike elements, and a number of traditional Japanese role-playing games. Shining Resonance Refrain was released on PlayStation 4, Xbox One, Steam PC and Nintendo Switch worldwide across 2018.

Dungeon crawler titles
In the dungeon crawler titles of the series (Shining in the Darkness and Shining the Holy Ark), the player takes control of an adventuring party.  Battles work very similarly to those of Dragon Quest, Mother, Shin Megami Tensei, and the fellow Sega RPG series Phantasy Star, in that they are first person and the player is placed in a position where the hero and team mates would be. Shining in the Darkness is the first game in the Shining series, and is a very simple labyrinth exploration game, with a simplified non explorable town and world map, where choices are made through a cursor system.  Shining the Holy Ark was released immediately prior to Shining Force III, and while it is also a dungeon crawler, it features a far more expanded gameplay world over the first title.

Strategy titles
For the strategy games of the series (Shining Force, Shining Force Gaiden, Shining Force Gaiden 2, Shining Force II, Shining Force Gaiden: Final Conflict, Shining Force CD, Shining Force III and Shining Force Feather), the player takes charge of a party in large-scale, strategic battles. The games generally limit the number of characters who can enter any one battle at a time to about a dozen. The player controls unique characters with their own stats, as opposed to generic unit types.

Action role-playing titles
The third broad category of Shining games is the action role-playing game set of titles. This incorporates: Shining Wisdom, Shining Soul, Shining Soul II, Shining Force Neo, Shining Tears, Shining Force EXA, Shining Wind, Shining Force Cross and Shining Resonance. The games it incorporates do not necessarily have any noticeable similarity in gameplay.  For instance, while Shining Tears uses similar mechanics to Shining Soul II, it has less in common with Shining Wisdom than it does with any of the strategy RPG titles of the series.

On 3 December 2009, Shining Force Cross was released as an arcade game for Sega's RingEdge system board. It is a multiplayer role-playing game with support for up to eight players, both online and offline. Within one month, nearly 2,400 Shining Force Cross machines had been sold to arcade operators by December 31, 2009. A sequel has been released for the RingEdge arcade system in 2012, Shining Force Cross Illusion.

Connections between games

Each game in the series has a standalone story, meaning that it is not required to play its predecessors to better understand its storyline. Nevertheless, most installments of the series prior to Shining Soul I often reference each other or have characters carried over. For example, in Shining Wisdom, the elf-cleric Sarah and elf-mage Kazin from Shining Force II make an important appearance. Shining Force Gaiden: Final Conflict and Shining Force II are two of the most related games, having the largest number of characters and locations in common.

From Shining Soul I onward, installments of the series tend to have less significant connections. For instance, in Shining Tears a character mentions the Klantol Kingdom (the setting for Shining Soul II) and tells its geographic location, but there is no interaction with any of the characters or plot events of Shining Soul II. However, Shining Wind and Shining Tears are some of the most closely connected pair of games in the series, since the former is a direct sequel to the latter and features return appearances by nearly all of the major characters.

Reboot by Sega 
Previously the Shining games from Shining in the Darkness to Shining Force III were solely developed by Sonic Software Planning which later became Camelot. The initial idea came from co-founder Hiroyuki Takahashi who previously was at Enix.

After Sega quit the hardware market, it was decided to reboot the Shining franchise. In charge of the so called "Shining Project" was Sega employee Tadashi Takezaki who joined marketing in 1993 and in 2004 was not only in charge of the Shining series, but also the Sakura Wars franchise and the official Japanese Sega website. According to Takezaki, when you think of Sega RPG's, you think of Phantasy Star and Shining. While Phantasy Star never strictly had a V entry, it was rebooted in the form of Phantasy Star Online. The Shining series never had an entry on the Dreamcast, due to various developers being busy with other projects and it being thought that it would be better to launch a new RPG instead, among other reasons. However, looking at the Japanese video game market, RPG's have the largest marketshare, so Sega decided to go ahead and restart the franchise, with a long-term plan, which included providing one game a year. This was new for Sega, people across different departments came together in 2001 to form what was called the "Shining Committee". The Committee included Takezaki himself, but also Youichi Shimosato who produced Shining Force: Resurrection of the Dark Dragon and Shining Force Neo, and also Tsuyoshi Sawada who produced Shining Tears. While the "Force" games were meant to harken back to the earlier titles, Tears was made from a completely blank slate for a modern audience, and looked at the Shining series from a new angle, much like Phantasy Star Online did.

Games

Cancelled Games

Reception
The Shining Force installments of the series were the first tactical role-playing games to have significant success in the U.S.

In 1996, Next Generation listed the Genesis and Sega CD entries of the series (but not Shining Wisdom or any of the Game Gear installments) collectively as number 77 on their "Top 100 Games of All Time". They lauded the series for replacing the then-standard generic RPG encounters with story-based battles, using an exciting character class system, and having brilliant pacing that keeps the games from ever dragging.

See also
 List of Japanese role-playing game franchises

References

External links
 Shining-world.jp: Sega's Shining series portal site

 
Video game franchises
Sega Games franchises
Video game franchises introduced in 1991
Video games adapted into television shows